The Ice Vault Arena (formerly named Capital One Ice Vault Arena and North Fork Ice Vault Arena) is a 600-seat multi-purpose arena in Wayne, New Jersey.  Built in 2003, it is home to the Jersey Hitmen of the United States Premier Hockey League and the William Paterson University Pioneers of the American Collegiate Hockey Association's Super East Collegiate Hockey League.  In the fall of 2011, it became home to the New Jersey Outlaws of the Federal Hockey League for one season, before the team moved to Williamsport, Pennsylvania.

Public skating, and stick and puck hours of operation vary based upon events scheduled. The arena also has a cafe, pro shop, and a pub called, "In The Crease Sports Pub". It formerly had an arcade.

By the mid-2010s, Capital One bought the naming rights of the arena, making it Capital One Ice Vault Arena.

References

External links

Current schedule
RinkAtlas entry for Ice Vault Arena

Indoor arenas in New Jersey
Sports venues in New Jersey
Indoor ice hockey venues in the United States
Wayne, New Jersey
Ice hockey in New Jersey
Tourist attractions in Passaic County, New Jersey
2003 establishments in New Jersey
Sports venues completed in 2003
College ice hockey venues in the United States